Abdul Sattar Khan, popularly known as Ustad Tari Khan, is a Pakistani tabla player and vocalist. Tari Khan hails from the Punjab gharana and is the student of Ustad Miyan Shaukat Hussain. He has been awarded with many accolades such as Taj Poshi (Golden Crown), the Hazrat Amir Khusrow Award, as well as Pakistan's Pride of Performance Award (Pakistan's highest artistic honor) in 2008. Tari Khan belongs to the tabla playing gharana called the Punjab gharana. Today, he is acknowledged as one of the foremost Tabla players of all time by musicians all over the world.

Early life
Tari Khan was born in Lahore, Pakistan. He hails from a traditional Rababi family (Muslim musicians employed in the royal Darbar Sahib, chief Sikh temple in Amritsar). His father was a classical vocalist. At the age of six, Tari was so captivated by the Tabla playing of Ustad Miyan Shaukat Hussain Khan, that for the next eight years, Tari Khan heard Ustad Mian Shaukat Hussain Khan's tabla at various events. At fourteen, he formally became a student of Ustad Miyan Shaukat Hussain Khan, thus beginning his journey into Tabla. Three years later, he would go on to perform at the death anniversary of tabla master Miyan Qadir Baksh for over 2 hours.

Career
Ustad Tari became famous as the accompanist of the ghazal singer Mehdi Hassan, as well as Ghulam Ali. He always provided an exquisite accompaniment: clean, crisp s with astonishingly quick and interesting s to punctuate the verses. Because of this international exposure, musicians in India got to hear of him at a time when little cultural news escaped from Pakistan. Since then, Tari has gone on to musical scene as a tabla showman. Ustad Tari Khan has earned and has been awarded with several titles in his lifetime. The titles and awards range from being crowned the Golden Crown Taj Poshi, the Hazrat Ameer Khusro Award, as well as Pakistan's Pride of Performance Award, which has earned him the title of Tabla Prince of India and Pakistan.

Tari Khan has accompanied various classical artists like Pandit Jasraj, Ustad Nusrat Fateh Ali Khan, Ustad Rahat Fateh Ali Khan, Roshan Ara Begum, Ustad Bade Fateh Ali Khan, Ustad Salamat Ali Khan, Ustad Ghulam Hassan Shaggan, Ustad Shafqat Ali Khan, Ustad Rais Khan (sitar player), Ustad Sharif Khan Poonchwaley (sitar player), Ustad Vilayat Khan (sitar player), and Pandit Ramesh Mishra, to name a few. He has also accompanied renowned singers like Ustad Mehdi Hassan, Ghulam Ali, Jagjit Singh, Talat Aziz, Hariharan, Parvez Mehdi, Shankar Mahadevan, and Hans Raj Hans, to name a few. 

"His fingers produce an amazing resonance on tabla," says Hans Raj Hans, a famous Punjabi Sufi music singer.

Some of his famous tabla pieces include "The Train", where he is able to mimic the sounds of a train on the tabla, and "International Keherwa", which features varying styles of the world in an 8 beat cycle.

Harballabh Sangeet Sammelan 
Tari Khan has performed at the oldest ongoing Hindustani classical music festival, Harballabh Sangeet Sammelan, at the 130th and 132nd festivals. Ustad Tari played a Teentaal (16 beat cycle) solo, his famous piece "International Keherwa" (8 beat cycle), and also had a vocal performance during the 130th Harballabh Sangeet Sammelan. Anuradha Shukla, of The Tribune India, noted that Ustad Tari Khan, "...gave music enthusiasts a treat both rare and divine." For his performance at the 132nd festival, The Tribune India noted that Ustad Tari's performance was "the limelight of the evening."

Festival of Tabla 
The Ravi & Shashi Bellare Arts Foundation is an organization, founded by Rupesh and Mona Kotecha, that preserves and presents the arts and culture of South Asia with a focus on Tabla and Indian classical music. The organization presented their annual Festival of Tabla in 2019, which showcased tabla solos, santoor and sarangi accompaniments, and other classical performances by various artists from all over the globe. The two-day festival featured Ustad Tari Khan and Pandit Anindo Chatterjee as headlining performances, along with performances from esteemed artists, such as Pandit Anand Badamikar, Pankaj Mishra (sarangi player), and Aditya Kalyanpur, among others. For his performance, Ustad Tari presented Teentaal (16 beat cycle) solo, with accompaniment on the santoor by Kamaljeet Ahluwalia, and his famous piece "International Keherwa." After Ustad Tari's teentaal performance, Pandit Anindo Chatterjee went on stage, as a sign of respect and appreciation, and shared his thoughts about Ustad Tari. Pandit Anindo Chatterjee had this to say after Ustad Tari's performance: "Once in a thousand years it comes, this kind of [artist]. The [discipline] and dedication that he has had in his life for tabla, we know that it is so fantastic, so melodious, and musical, and rhythmic. Today, he took so much intricate, intricate tihai and rhythmic pattern that [it was] unbelievable. I really pray to God that Tari bhai should live many, many years and we can listen [to] him. Please bless and love him."

Vocal singing career
Ustad Tari has also shown his talent in singing. He is a disciple of Ustad Mehdi Hassan and learned singing from him.

Discography 

 Blue Moods: Ghazal and Hindi Collection (2000) - Ehsan Aman
 Samvad (Conversation) with Ustad Tari Khan (2005) - Deepak Ram
 Sangam (2006) - Alif Laila
 An Unforgettable Evening with Ustad Tari Khan (2008)

Personal life
Tari Khan lives in California, US. He trains his disciples in Tabla in California also. He has a number of followers around the world and has several students across the globe.

"Expanding his horizons, he moved to California 16 years ago, founded an academy for tabla studies there, and started touring universities and conservatories throughout America and Europe. At the same time, he's been absorbing the creative influences of other musics: jazz, African, rock, etc."

References
Notes

Sources
Mistry, Aban E. (1999). Pakhawaj & Tabla: History, Schools and Traditions. . Digitala.

External links
 

Gharana
Instrumental gharanas
Tabla gharanas
Tabla players
Hindustani instrumentalists
Pakistani musicians
Punjabi culture
Living people
1953 births
Classical music in Pakistan
Pakistani percussionists
Recipients of the Pride of Performance